Sara Martínez Puntero (born 26 February 1990 in Madrid, Spain)  is a Paralympic athlete from Spain competing mainly in category F12 track and field events.

Personal 
Martínez was born on 26 February 1990 in Madrid, Spain, and has partial vision. In 2012, she lived in Madrid.

Athletics 
Martínez mainly competed in category F12 track and field events, and represents Madrid in Spanish national competitions.

Martínez competed in the 2009 Spanish National Athletics Championship where she finished first in the women's visually impaired long jump. At the 2011 Basauri Meeting track and field event, she finished first in the long jump with a distance of 5.40 meters. The 2011 Spanish National Adaptive Athletics Championships were held in Valencia and she competed in them. She competed at the 2011 IPC World Athletics Championships in Christchurch, New Zealand where she finished fourth in the long jump and seventh in the 100 meters. In 2012, she was a recipient of a Plan ADOP €6,000 athlete scholarship and a €2,500 coaching scholarship. Prior to the start of the London Games, she trained with several other visually impaired Spanish track and field athletes in Logroño. In the lead up to the London Paralympics, in July 2012, she competed in a Diamond League race at the Crystal Palace National Sports Centre in London. In March 2013 at the Spanish Athletics Paralympic Championship, she qualified for the 2013 IPC Athletics World Championships in the 100 meter event. She competed at the Basauriko Probak 2013, a qualifying event for a number of other Spanish competitor for the IPC World Championships.  In May 2013, she competed in the Spanish national championships, where she earned a gold medal in the long jump. In July 2013, she participated in the 2013 IPC Athletics World Championships.

Paralympics 
Martínez competed in the 2004 Summer Paralympics, 2008 Summer Paralympics and 2012 Summer Paralympics in the 100 meter and long jump events.  In London, she did qualify for the finals of the 100 meter race following her performance in the semi-finals.

References 

1990 births
Living people
Spanish disability athletes
Paralympic athletes of Spain
Paralympic long jumpers
Athletes (track and field) at the 2004 Summer Paralympics
Athletes (track and field) at the 2008 Summer Paralympics
Athletes (track and field) at the 2012 Summer Paralympics
Athletes (track and field) at the 2020 Summer Paralympics
Medalists at the 2020 Summer Paralympics
Paralympic silver medalists for Spain
Paralympic medalists in athletics (track and field)
Athletes from Madrid
Plan ADOP alumni
Visually impaired long jumpers
Spanish female sprinters
Spanish female long jumpers